Vernonia aosteana is a species of perennial plant in the family Asteraceae. It is native to Zimbabwe.

References 

aosteana
Flora of Zimbabwe